Friedrich, Prince of Schwarzenberg could refer to:

 Friedrich, Prince of Schwarzenberg (soldier)
 Friedrich, Prince of Schwarzenberg (cardinal)